Constitution of Scotland may refer to:
Scotland Act 1998, the framework of devolution to Scotland
"A Constitution for a Free Scotland", a document published by the Scottish National Party in 2002